Lillian Kwok Ling-lai (born 20 April 1979) is a Hong Kong registered teacher and politician who has been a member of the Legislative Council for the Election Committee constituency which was newly created under the electoral overhaul imposed by Beijing.

Education 
Kwok completed her senior secondary and matriculation course curricula at the Pooi To Middle School in 1996 and New Asia Middle School in 1998 respectively. Afterwards, she earned a diploma in education from the Hong Kong Institute of Education and became a registered teacher in 2000, specialising in the area of special education needs. Pursuing further studies subsequently, Kwok attained a Bachelor of Arts from the Education University of Hong Kong in 2014 and a Master of Education from the Hong Kong Metropolitan University in 2021.

Controversies 
On 5 January 2022, Carrie Lam announced new warnings and restrictions against social gathering due to potential COVID-19 outbreaks. One day later, it was discovered that Kwok attended a birthday party hosted by Witman Hung Wai-man, with 222 guests. At least one guest tested positive with COVID-19, causing many guests to be quarantined.

During Kwok's Legislative Council campaign, she described her occupation as a teacher. However, after she was elected, her declaration of interests from January 2022 revealed that her occupations were a hotel training consultant and an insurance consultant. Kwok told SCMP that she had actually retired as a teacher in 2018, and claimed that she became an insurance consultant to prevent being scammed.

Electoral history

References 

Living people
Democratic Alliance for the Betterment and Progress of Hong Kong politicians
HK LegCo Members 2022–2025
Hong Kong pro-Beijing politicians
1979 births